The 4th Chess Olympiad, organized by the Fédération Internationale des Échecs (FIDE) and comprising an open and (unofficial) women's tournament, as well as several events designed to promote the game of chess, took place between July 11 and July 26, 1931, in Prague, Czechoslovakia. The 3rd Women's World Chess Championship also took place during the Olympiad.

Results

Team standings

{| class="wikitable"
! # !!Country !! Players !! Points
|-
| style="background:gold;"|1 ||  || Kashdan, Marshall, Dake, Horowitz, Steiner H. || 48 
|-
| style="background:silver;"|2 ||  || Rubinstein, Tartakower, Przepiórka, Makarczyk, Frydman || 47
|-
| style="background:#cc9966;"|3 ||  || Flohr, Gilg, Rejfíř, Opočenský, Skalička || 46½
|-
| 4 ||  || Vidmar, Asztalos, Kostić, Pirc, König || 46
|-
| 5 ||  || Bogoljubow, Ahues, Wagner, Richter, Helling || 45½
|-
| 6 ||  || Matisons, Apšenieks, Petrovs, Feigins, Hasenfuss || 45½
|-
| 7 ||  || Ståhlberg, Stoltz, Berndtsson, Lundin || 45½
|-
| 8 ||  || Grünfeld, Spielmann, Kmoch, Becker, Lokvenc || 45
|-
| 9 ||  || Sultan Khan, Yates, Thomas, Winter,  Wahltuch || 44
|-
| 10 ||  Hungary || Steiner E., Steiner L., Vajda, Havasi, Sterk || 39½
|-
| 11 ||  || Weenink, Noteboom, Van den Bosch, Addicks, Van Doesburgh || 35
|-
| 12 ||  || Johner H., Naegeli, Zimmermann, Rivier, Michel || 34
|-
| 13 ||  || Mikėnas, Šeinbergas, Vistaneckis, Abramavičius, Luckis || 30½
|-
| 14 ||  || Alekhine, Gromer, Kahn, Betbeder, Duchamp || 29½
|-
| 15 ||  || Erdélyi, Balogh, Baratz, Gudju, Wechsler || 28
|-
| 16 ||  Italy || Rosselli del Turco, Monticelli, Romi, Hellmann || 24
|-
| 17 ||  || Andersen, Cruusberg, Ruben, Lie, Larsen || 19½
|-
| 18 ||  || Christoffersen, Hansen, Halvorsen, Hovind, Gulbrandsen || 15½
|-
| 19 ||  || Golmayo, Vilardebó, Soler, Marín y Llovet, Sanz Aguado || 15½
|}

Team results

Individual medals

For the first time, medals were awarded to the top three individual players on each board.

{| class="wikitable"
! Board 1 !! !! Board 2 !! !! Board 3 !! !! Board 4 !! !! Reserve !! 
|-
|  Alexander Alekhine || style="background:gold;"| 13½ / 1875.0 ||  Gösta Stoltz || style="background:gold;"| 13½ / 1875.0 ||  Vladimirs Petrovs || style="background:gold;"| 11½ / 1671.9 ||  Albert Becker || style="background:gold;"| 10½ / 1475.0 ||  Karel Skalička || style="background:gold;"| 10½ / 1475.0
|-
|  Efim Bogoljubow || style="background:silver;"| 12½ / 1773.5 ||  Savielly Tartakower || style="background:gold;"| 13½ / 1875.0 ||  George Alan Thomas || style="background:silver;"| 12½ / 1869.4 ||  Vasja Pirc || style="background:silver;"| 12½ / 1773.5 ||  Herman Steiner || style="background:silver;"| 8½ / 1270.8
|-
|  Isaac Kashdan || style="background:#cc9966;"| 12 / 1770.6 ||  Lajos Steiner || style="background:#cc9966;"| 12 / 1770.6 ||  Josef Rejfiř || style="background:#cc9966;"| 11 / 1668.8 ||  Kurt Richter || style="background:#cc9966;"| 10½ / 1570.0 ||  Wolfgang Hasenfuss || style="background:#cc9966;"| 7½ / 1168.2
|}

Notes

References
4th Chess Olympiad: Prague 1931 OlimpBase

04
Olympiad 04
Chess Olympiad 04
Olympiad 04
Chess Olympiad 04
1930s in Prague
July 1931 sports events